Geevarghese Mar Divannasios Ottathengil (1 November 1950 - 16 January 2018) was the Bishop of Syro-Malankara Catholic Eparchy of Puthur from 2010 until 2017. Ottathengil was ordained to the priesthood in 1978.

References

External links
 Catholic-hierarchy.org 
 Bathery.org

1950 births
2018 deaths
Syro-Malankara bishops
People from Karnataka